My Place is the second studio album by Polish jazz singer Monika Borzym. It was released on 15 October 2013 through Sony Music Entertainment Poland. The album is promoted by the single "Off to Sea". It was certified Gold in Poland two weeks after its premiere.

Recording and production
My Place was produced by Matt Pierson, with whom Borzym has previously worked on her debut album, Girl Talk (2011). Borzym wrote most of the tracks with a friend, pianist Mariusz Obijalski. The album also features three covers: a jazz version of Rihanna's hit single "Only Girl (in the World)", "The Quiet Crowd" by Patrick Watson, and Kenny Rankin's "In the Name of Love".

Borzym was joined in the studio by guitarist Larry Campbell (collaborator of Bob Dylan and Paul Simon), drummer Kenny Wollesen (John Zorn, Norah Jones), and bassist Tony Scherr (Norah Jones, Bill Frisell). The album also features guest appearances by guitarists John Scofield (Miles Davis, Charles Mingus, Herbie Hancock, Pat Metheny), Romero Lubambo and Steve Cardenas, saxophonist Chris Potter and trumpeter Randy Brecker.

Track listing

Personnel
Musicians
Monika Borzym – vocals
Larry Campbell – guitar
Kenny Wollesen – drums
Tony Scherr – bass
John Scofield – guitar
Romero Lubambo – acoustic guitar
Steve Cardenas - guitar
Chris Potter – saxophone
Randy Brecker – trumpet
Technical personnel
Matt Pierson – production

Charts and certifications

Charts

Certifications

References

2013 albums
Monika Borzym albums
Sony Music Poland albums